Botakara is a lake in Bukhar-Zhyrau District, Karaganda Region, Kazakhstan. It is part of the Nura basin.

Botakara village (formerly "Ulyanovsk") lies to the south close to the lakeshore. To the west lies a separate sector of the settlement, including the high school and a poultry farm.

Geography
Botakara lake lies in the Kazakh Uplands. The lakeshores are flat and sandy and the bottom of the lake has smooth clay. The water of the lake is fresh and slightly hard. The southwestern and northwestern shorelines are almost joined by seasonally submerged landspits, stretching to an island in the middle. 

The Nura flows  to the south of the lake. The Otkelsiz river enters the lake from the northeast and flows out of it from the southern shore to join the Nura. Botakara lake freezes in November and stays under ice until early April. The highest level of the lake is in April during the spring floods, when it almost doubles in size.

Flora and fauna
Reeds and sedges grow in stretches of the shore. There are numerous waterfowl in the lake. The main fish species in its waters are perch, karabalik and carp.

See also 
List of lakes of Kazakhstan

References

External links
Рыбалка на озере Ботакара! Карась!!! (in Russian)
Угроза подтопления снята в 380 населенных пунктах Казахстана

Lakes of Kazakhstan
Endorheic lakes of Asia
Karaganda Region
Kazakh Uplands

kk:Ботақара (көл)